The Devil's Pipeline is a 1940 American drama film directed by Christy Cabanne. It stars Richard Arlen, Andy Devine, and John Eldredge, and was released on November 1, 1940.

Cast list

References

External links

 
 
 

Universal Pictures films
American drama films
1940 drama films
1940 films
Films directed by Christy Cabanne
American black-and-white films
Films scored by Hans J. Salter
1940s American films